The Franklin Street station was a station on the demolished IRT Sixth Avenue Line in Manhattan, New York City. It was located at Franklin Street and West Broadway, and it had two tracks and two side platforms. There was space for two additional tracks in the station. South of the station there are two additional tracks that served to layup trains.

History 
The station opened on June 5, 1878 as part of a line along Trinity Place, Church Avenue, West Broadway, and Sixth Avenue between Rector Street and 58th Street. The line was built by the Gilbert Elevated Railway Company, which would later come to be known as the Metropolitan Elevated Railway Company.

The station closed on December 4, 1938 with the rest of the Sixth Avenue Elevated. The Franklin Street station on the IRT Broadway–Seventh Avenue Line is the closest subway station to serve as a replacement.

References

IRT Sixth Avenue Line stations
Railway stations in the United States opened in 1878
Railway stations closed in 1938
Former elevated and subway stations in Manhattan
1878 establishments in New York (state)
1938 disestablishments in New York (state)